The McCormack reaction is a method for the synthesis of organophosphorus compounds. In this reaction, a 1,3-diene and a source of R2P+ are combined to give phospholenium cation. The reaction is named after W. B. McCormack, a research chemist at duPont.

An illustrative reaction involves phenyldichlorophosphine and isoprene:

The reaction proceeds via a pericyclic [2+4]-process. The resulting derivatives can be hydrolyzed to give the phosphine oxide.  Dehydrohalogenation gives the phosphole.

References

Cycloadditions
Cheletropic reactions
Name reactions